Spain participated in the 2010 Summer Youth Olympics in Singapore.

The Spanish team included 46 athletes competing in 15 sports.

Medalists

Archery

Boys

Girls

Mixed Team

Athletics

Boys
Track and Road Events

Field Events

Girls
Field Events

Badminton

Girls

Basketball

Boys

Canoeing

Boys

Girls

Cycling

Cross Country

Time Trial

BMX

Road Race

Overall

Gymnastics

Artistic Gymnastics

Boys

Girls

Rhythmic Gymnastics 

Individual

Judo

Individual

Team

Modern pentathlon

Rowing

Sailing

One Person Dinghy

Windsurfing

Swimming

Boys

Girls

Mixed

Taekwondo

Triathlon

Girls

Boys

Mixed

Weightlifting

Girls

References

Oly
Nations at the 2010 Summer Youth Olympics
Spain at the Youth Olympics